James Carter was an English footballer active at the turn of the 20th century. He made a total of 43 appearances in The Football League for Blackburn Rovers.

References

English footballers
Year of birth missing
English Football League players
Blackburn Rovers F.C. players
Preston North End F.C. players
Millwall F.C. players
Gillingham F.C. players
Date of death missing
Association footballers not categorized by position